Dacia Buiucani is a Moldovan football club from the Buiucani sector of Chișinău. The club competes in the Moldovan Super Liga, the first tier of Moldovan football. The academy of the club is called CSCT Buiucani. CSCT is an abbreviation for Sports Club for Children and Youth.

The club plays its home matches at Joma Arena, which has a capacity of 2,000 spectators. The current head coach is Andrei Martin.

History
The club was founded as CSCA Buiucani on 25 September 1997. In July 2011, the club became FC Dacia Chișinău's reserve team and changed name to Dacia-2 Buiucani. This cooperation lasted until March 2018, when Dacia Chișinău withdrew from the Moldovan National Division. Dacia Buiucani then started anew in the third tier of Moldovan football. They achieved two consecutive promotions and finished in 5th place in their first season in the top division. In June 2021, Dacia Buiucani were voluntarily relegated from the Moldovan National Division due to financial reasons.

Name history
1997–2011: CSCA Buiucani
2011–2017: Dacia-2 Buiucani
Since 2018: Dacia Buiucani

Honours
Divizia A
Runners-up (2): 2013–14, 2019

Divizia B
Runners-up (1): 2018

Current squad

Recent seasons

References

External links
Official website
Dacia Buiucani at WorldFootball.net

Football clubs in Moldova
Football clubs in Chișinău
FC Dacia Chișinău
Association football clubs established in 1997
1997 establishments in Moldova